Andrea Tiritiello (born 28 March 1995) is an Italian football player. He plays for  club Lucchese.

Club career
He is the product of Livorno youth teams. He made several bench appearances for Livorno's senior squad in 2013–14 Serie A season, but did not see any time on the field.

After Livorno, he spent two seasons in Serie D.

He made his Serie C debut for Tuttocuoio on 28 August 2016 in a game against Prato, as a 90th-minute substitute for Diego Borghini.

On 25 July 2018, he signed a three-year contract with Serie B club Cosenza.

On 8 January 2019, he joined Virtus Francavilla on loan. On 9 August 2019, the loan was renewed.

On 26 August 2022, Tiritiello moved to Lucchese.

References

External links
 

1995 births
Sportspeople from the Province of Livorno
Footballers from Tuscany
Living people
Italian footballers
Association football defenders
U.S. Livorno 1915 players
U.S. Poggibonsi players
U.S. Gavorrano players
A.C. Tuttocuoio 1957 San Miniato players
S.S. Fidelis Andria 1928 players
Cosenza Calcio players
Virtus Francavilla Calcio players
Lucchese 1905 players
Serie B players
Serie C players
Serie D players